Bajo Baudó is a municipality and town in the Chocó Department, Colombia.  It was founded in 1821 and converted into a municipality in 1825. Most of the towns' population of 16,375 live in rural areas.

Climate
Bajo Baudó has a very wet tropical rainforest climate (Af) with very heavy to extremely heavy rainfall year-round.

External links
Official website

References

Municipalities of Chocó Department